Maria Nicolae is a Romanian sprint canoer who competed in the late 1970s. She won two bronze medals in the K-4 500 m event at the ICF Canoe Sprint World Championships, earning them in 1978 and 1979.

References

Living people
Romanian female canoeists
Year of birth missing (living people)
ICF Canoe Sprint World Championships medalists in kayak